The Later Liang (386–403) was a dynastic state of China and one of the Sixteen Kingdoms in Chinese history. It was founded by the Lü family of the Di ethnicity.

All rulers of the Later Liang proclaimed themselves "Heavenly Prince" (Tian Wang).

Rulers of the Later Liang

Rulers family tree

See also
Di (Wu Hu)
List of past Chinese ethnic groups
Wu Hu
Sixteen Kingdoms
Buddhism in China
Kumarajiva
Gansu
Dunhuang
Memoirs of Eminent Monks

References

 
Dynasties in Chinese history
Former countries in Chinese history
386 establishments
4th-century establishments in China
5th-century disestablishments in China